The Togolese Football Federation or FTF is the governing body of football in Togo. In 2006, the Togo national football team participated for first time in the 2006 World Cup in Germany.

Staff
 President: AKPOVY Kossi
 Vice President: WALLA Bernard
 General Secretary: LAMADOKOU Kossi
 Treasurer: BEDINADE Bireani
 Media Officer: AMEGA Koffi
 Men's Coach: LE ROY Claude
 Women's Coach: ZOUNGBEDE Paul (TOG)
 Futsal Coordinator: PATATU Amavi
 Referee Coordinator: AZALEKO Amewossina

Leagues

There are 9 major football leagues in Togo.

 Lomé Commune Lomé
 Ligue Maritime Est Aného, Tabligbo, Vo, Togoville, Akoumapé
 Ligue Maritime Ouest Lomé: Tsévié and Kévé prefectures
 Ligue de Kloto Kpalimé, Amou, Danyi
 Ligue des Plateaux Est Atakpamé, Notse, Tohoun
 Ligue des Plateaux Ouest Amlamé, Badou
 Ligue du Centre Sokodé, Tchamba, Sotouboua, Bassar, Blitta, Gérin-Kouka
 Ligue de la Kara Kara, Niamtougou, Pagouda, Bafilo
 Ligue des Savanes Dapaong, Mango, Kantè, Barkoissi, Bombouaka

Clubs

Notable FTF football clubs.
Abou Ossé FC (Anié)
AC Semassi FC (Sokodé)
AS Douane (Lomé)
ASKO Kara (Kara)
Dynamic Togolais (Lomé)
Etoile Filante de Lomé
Gomido FC (Kpalime)
Kotoko FC (Lavié)
Maranatha FC (Fiokpo)
Tchaoudjo AC (Sokodé)
US Kokori (Tchamba)
US Masséda (Masseville)
AC Merlan (Lomé)
AS Togo-Port (Lomé)
Foadan FC (Dapaong)
Togo Telecom FC (Lomé)
Sara Sport de Bafilo

References

External links
 Federation Togolaise de Football 
  
 Togo at the FIFA website. 
 Togo at CAF Online

Togo
Football in Togo
Sports organizations established in 1960
Football